GotoBus is a travel website headquartered in Cambridge, Massachusetts.

The website provides travel products and services, such as inter-city bus tickets, sightseeing tours and hotel accommodations to those traveling among destinations in both North America and Europe.

History 
The company, which operates exclusively online at GotoBus.com, was founded in 2002 by CEO and Cambridge resident Jimmy Chen. In 2011, TakeTours.com was introduced as a spin-off from GotoBus.

Locations 
Since then, GotoBus has opened additional offices in Los Angeles, CA; Hangzhou, China; and Bratislava, Slovakia.

References

External links 
 
 Corporate Website

Companies based in Suffolk County, Massachusetts
Comparison shopping websites
Internet properties established in 2002
American travel websites
Organizations based in Boston
Route planning software
Software companies based in Massachusetts
Travel ticket search engines
Software companies of the United States